General elections were held in Thailand on 26 February 1952. At the time there were no political parties, so all candidates ran as independents. Voter turnout was 39%.

Results

References

Thailand
General
Elections in Thailand
Election and referendum articles with incomplete results
Non-partisan elections